George Burgess may refer to:

George Henry Burgess (1831–1905), English-born landscape painter, wood engraver and lithographer
George Farmer Burgess (1861–1919), American Democratic politician
George K. Burgess (1874–1932), American physicist, scientific writer and translator, expert on metallurgy
George Burgess (biologist) (born 1949), American shark expert and author
George Burgess (bishop) (1809–1866), American clergyman and religious leader, first bishop of Episcopal Diocese of Maine
George Burgess (politician) (1863–1941), New South Wales politician
George Burgess (rugby league) (born 1992), English rugby league player
George Burgess (rugby union) (1883–1961), New Zealand rugby union player

See also
George Burges (1786–1864), English literary scholar who specialised in classical Greek